Super Roots 3 is the third installment of the Super Roots EP series by Japanese experimental band Boredoms. It consists of one song, half an hour in length, which has a repetitive rhythm throughout.

Track listing
"Hard Trance Away (Karaoke of the Cosmos)" – 33:32

References

Boredoms EPs
1994 EPs